The Grand Army of the Republic Cemetery is a cemetery for American Civil War  veterans in the U.S. city of Portland, Oregon.  It is located at S.W. Palatine Hill Road and S.W. Boones Ferry Road, next to River View Cemetery.

Fourteen Union Civil War veterans, members of the Grand Army of the Republic, formed the Grand Army Cemetery Association and purchased the cemetery in 1882. The Daughters of Union Veterans of the Civil War took over the management and administration of the cemetery at that time.

Ownership of the cemetery eventually passed to the State of Oregon in 1961 then to Multnomah County, Oregon in 1971. In 1996 ownership was granted to Metro Regional Parks and Greenspaces.  The oldest marker is dated October 15, 1889.

Salmon Brown, son of John Brown (of the song "John Brown's Body") is buried here, as is Hartwell B. Compson (1842–1905), who received the Medal of Honor for heroism in the Civil War.

See also

 Grand Army of the Republic Cemetery (Seattle)

References

External links
 
 Union Army sentry returns to his Portland post after long absence - The Oregonian
 

1882 establishments in Oregon
Cemeteries in Portland, Oregon
Oregon
Metro (Oregon regional government)
Oregon in the American Civil War
Southwest Portland, Oregon